Leptothorax buschingeri is a species of ant in the genus Leptothorax. It is endemic to Switzerland.

References

buschingeri
Hymenoptera of Europe
Insects described in 1967
Endemic fauna of Switzerland
Taxonomy articles created by Polbot